The Epipleminae or epiplemiine moths are a subfamily of the lepidopteran family Uraniidae. The subfamily was first described by George Hampson in 1892. They are the most diverse and widespread uraniid group, occurring mainly throughout the Pantropics but barely reaching into the temperate regions. The Epipleminae are notable for the sexually dimorphic tympanal organ which is unlike any other lepidopteran's in details of its morphology. Some species are also peculiar in being able to roll their wings into a stick-like shape, possibly as a form of crypsis. Such behavior has hitherto only been found in this subfamily and the quite unrelated Ennominae (Sohn & Yen 2005).

Unlike the often colorful Uraniinae, they are smallish and drab species, and have earlier been erroneously placed with the Geometridae or Drepanidae based on phenetic considerations. Only three species have come to note as minor pests of commercial plants:

 Leucoplema dohertyi
 Epiplema fulvilinea – does not belong into this genus
 Dysaethria moza – formerly Epiplema

Genera
This list of genera is preliminary. A complete review of the subfamily seems hardly possible as a monographical work given its diversity, so it will probably be reviewed piecemeal (e.g. Sohn & Yen 2005). Several genera are known (Epiplema) or suspected (Monobolodes, Phazaca) not to be monophyletic, or may be altogether invalid (Sohn & Yen 2005).

Acropterygia
Alaplena
Anorthodisca
Antiplecta
Aoratosema
Aorista
Aphyodes
Arussiana
Asyngria
Bicavernosa
Calledapteryx
Callizzia
Capnophylla
Cathetus_(moth)
Ceronaba
Chaetoceras
Chaetopyga
Chionoplema
Chrysocestis
Chundana
Cirrhura
Coelura
Coeluromima
Coelurotricha
Crypsicoela
Dasmeuda
Decetiodes
Dicroplema
Dysaethria
Dysrhombia
Epiplema (polyphyletic)
Erosia
Europlema
Eversmannia
Falcinodes
Gathynia
Gymnoplocia
Heteroplema
Hyperplema
Hypophysaria
Hypoplema
Leuconotha
Leucoplema
Lophopygia
Lophotosoma
Macrostylodes
Madepiplema
Meleaba
Menda
Mesoglypta
Metorthocheilus
Microniodes
Molybdophora
Monobolodes – includes Cathetus. Monophyly requires confirmation.
Monoplema
Morphomima
Nedusia
Neodeta
Neodirades
Neoplema
Notoptya
Nyctibadistes
Oroplema
Orudiza
Paloda
Paradecetia
Paradirades
Paroecia
Paurophlebs
Phazaca - includes Balantiucha, Dirades, Diradopsis, Homoplexis, Lobogethes. Monophyly requires confirmation.
Philagraula
Platerosia
Powondrella
Psamathia
Pseudhyria
Pseudodirades
Pterotosoma
Rhombophylla
Saccoploca
Schidax
Siculodopsis
Skaphion
Symphytophleps
Syngria
Syngriodes
Thysanocraspeda
Tricolpia
Trotorhombia
Warreniplema

References
 Sohn, Jae-Cheon & Yen, Shen-Horn (2005). "A Taxonomic Revision of the Korean Epipleminae (Lepidoptera: Uraniidae), with Phylogenetic Comments on the Involved Genera". Zoological Studies. 44(1): 44–70.

Uraniidae
Pantropical fauna